Perochirus is a genus of geckos endemic to the Philippines, Oceania and Japan, commonly known as Micronesian geckos, Polynesian geckos, or tropical geckos.

Species
The following three species are recognized as being valid. 
Perochirus ateles  – Duméril's tropical gecko, Micronesia saw-tailed gecko
Perochirus guentheri  – Günther's tropical gecko, Vanuatu saw-tailed gecko
Perochirus scutellatus  – shielded tropical gecko, atoll giant gecko

Nota bene: A binomial authority in parentheses indicates that the species was originally described in a genus other than Perochirus.

References

Further reading
Boulenger GA (1885). Catalogue of the Lizards in the British Museum (Natural History). Second Edition. Volume I. Geckonidæ ... London: Trustees of the British Museum (Natural History). (Taylor and Francis, printers). xii + 436 pp. + Plates I-XXXII. (Perochirus, new genus, p. 154).

 
Lizard genera
Taxa named by George Albert Boulenger